Rostislav Vsevolodovich (c. 1070–1093) was the Prince of Pereyaslavl (1078–1093), son of Vsevolod I of Kiev, and half brother of Vladimir Monomakh. He fought at Stugna river against the Cumans and drowned while fleeing the battle.

Notes

Rurik dynasty
1070s births
1093 deaths
Eastern Orthodox monarchs
Princes of Pereyaslavl
11th-century princes in Kievan Rus'